Young Rival is a Canadian indie rock band from Hamilton, Ontario. It consists of singer-guitarist Aron D'Alesio, bassist John Smith, and drummer Noah Fralick.

History
In the early 2000s, the group was called The Ride Theory, and released two full-length albums under that name. They changed both the band's name and its musical style in 2007, and it became Young Rival. Guitarist Kyle Kuchmey left the band at the end of 2009.

Young Rival signed to Sonic Unyon. After releasing an EP, the band toured as opening act for The Sadies and for Born Ruffians.

The self-titled debut album was recorded partly in Toronto at HallaMusic Recording Studios and partly in New York City. The band enlisted the talents of American artist James Kuhn to provide face paint art and lip synching talent for the video for the track "Two Reasons" from their October 2012 release, Stay Young.

In 2015 Young Rival released an album of 60s-style pop music, Interior Light, through Paper Bag Records. This album appeared on the !earshot National Top 50 Chart in December that year.  Five additional tracks were released as an EP, Strange Light, in 2016.

Members 
 Aron D'Alesio – vocals, guitar
 John Smith – bass
 Noah Fralick – drums

Discography

Albums
 2010: Young Rival
 2012: Stay Young
 2015: Interior Light
 2016: Strange Light

EPs
 2008: Young Rival EP

Singles

References

External links 
 Young Rival official site
 Young Rival at CBC Radio 3

Musical groups established in 2007
Canadian indie rock groups
Musical groups from Hamilton, Ontario
2007 establishments in Ontario
Sonic Unyon artists